The Prix Saint-Michel is a series of comic awards presented by the city of Brussels, with a focus on Franco-Belgian comics. They were first awarded in 1971, and although often said to be the oldest European comics awards, they are actually the second oldest comics award in Europe still presented, behind the Adamson Awards. Their history is quite erratic though, with a long pause between 1986 and 2002.

The jury of the Prix Saint-Michel is formed by professionals from the comics industry, including publishers, editors, and creators.

1971 
 Grand Prix Saint-Michel: Edgar Pierre Jacobs
 Best realistic artwork: Victor Hubinon
 Best comical artwork: prize shared by Willy Vandersteen and Jean Roba
 Best science-fiction artwork: Eddy Paape
 Best European artist: Jean Giraud
 Best non-European artist: Al Capp
 Best realistic writing: Jean-Michel Charlier
 Best comical writing: Maurice Tillieux
 Best science-fiction writing: Greg
 Comics promotion: CSP Imagine (organizers of the Lucca Comics & Games festival)
 Future prize: realistic: Juan Manuel Cicuéndez
 Future prize: comical: Dany

1972 
 Grand Prix Saint-Michel: Morris
 Best graphical research: Les Conquérants du Mexique by Jean Torton
 Best realistic artwork: William Vance
 Best comical artwork: André Franquin
 Best science-fiction artwork: Edgar P. Jacobs
 Best European artist: Sydney Jordan
 Best non-European artist: Richard Corben
 Best realistic writing: Greg
 Best comical writing: Raoul Cauvin
 Best science-fiction writing: Greg
 Comics promotion: Vasco Granja (for promoting comics in Portugal)

1973 
 Grand Prix Saint-Michel: Hergé
 Best comical artwork: Berck
 Best research and documentation: Jacques Devos
 Best realistic artwork: Comanche by Hermann, Le Lombard
 Best comical artwork: Sammy by Berck, Dupuis
 Best science-fiction artwork: Les Petits hommes by Pierre Seron, Dupuis
 Best European artist: Bonvi (Franco Bonvicini), for Sturmtruppen
 Best non-European artist: Jim Steranko
 Best realistic writing: François Craenhals, for Chevalier Ardent, Casterman
 Best comical writing: Peyo and Yvan Delporte, for The Smurfs
 Best science-fiction writing: Vicq, for Sophie, Dupuis
 Comics promotion: Claude Moliterni, for his work with the French Society of Bandes Dessinées
 Special mention (humour): Louis Salvérius (posthumous)
 Special mention (science-fiction): Philippe Druillet for Lone Sloane

1974 
 Grand Prix Saint-Michel: Jacques Laudy
 Best comic: Yoko Tsuno: La Forge de Vulcain by Roger Leloup, Dupuis
 Best comic (joint winner): Buddy Longway: Chinook by Derib, Le Lombard
 Best realistic artwork: Corentin: Le royaume des eaux noirs by Paul Cuvelier
 Best realistic story: Hugo Pratt
 Best satiric story: Le sergeant Laterreur by Gérald Frydman
 Best satiric artwork: Rififi by Mouminoux
 Best comical artwork: Le sergeant Laterreur by Touis
 Best comical story: Nero: Het lachvirus by Marc Sleen, Standaard Uitgeverij
 Research: Rock Dreams by Guy Peellaert
 Best foreign artist: La vie au grand air by Jean-Marc Reiser
 Special prize: Roland Topor, for his collaboration to the movie La Planète Sauvage

1975 
 Grand Prix Saint-Michel: Jijé
 Best comical artwork: Sammy: Les gorilles font les fous by Berck (artist) and Raoul Cauvin (author), Dupuis
 Best realistic artwork: Claude Auclair
 Best fantasy artwork: Sirius
 Best foreign artist: F'Murr
 Best comical story: Raoul Cauvin
 Best realistic story: Claude Auclair
 Best fantasy story: Sirius
 Revelation: René Follet
 CABD Prize: Jacques Stocquart

1976 
 Grand Prix Saint-Michel: Moebius
 Best epic artwork: Chevalier ardent: La dame des sables by François Craenhals, Casterman
 Best fantasy artwork: Wladimir by Monique and Carlos Roque, Dupuis 
 Best foreign artist: Alex Barbier
 Best realistic story: Claude Auclair
 Best animated movie: Tarzoon by Boris Szulzinger
 Revelation (joint winners): René Deynis and Cosey

1977 
 Grand Prix Saint-Michel: Jacques Tardi
 Best realistic artwork: Claude Auclair
 Best comical artwork: Marc Wasterlain
 Best foreign artist: Bonvi and Michel Blanc-Dumont
 Best realistic writing: Hugo Pratt
 Best comical writing: Raoul Cauvin
 Revelation: Serge Ernst

1978 
Grand Prix Saint-Michel: Yvan Delporte
 Best story: Histoire sans héros by Jean Van Hamme, Le Lombard
Best comical story: Christian Godard
 Future: Frédéric Jannin
 Prix: Le goulag part 1 by Dimitri}, Le Square

1979 
 Grand Prix Saint-Michel: Cosey
 Best realistic artwork: Thorgal: L'île des mers gelées by Rosinski, Le Lombard
 Best comical story: Bidouille et Violette by Bernard Hislaire, Dupuis
 Best comical story (joint winner): Docteur Poche: L'île des hommes-papillons by Marc Wasterlain, Dupuis

1980 
 Grand Prix Saint-Michel: Didier Comès
 Best story: Jean Van Hamme
 Prix: Jeremiah by Hermann, Le Lombard
 Best comical artist: André Geerts

1981 
 Grand Prix Saint-Michel: Pastiches by Roger Brunel
 Best comic: Le Bal du Rat mort FR  by Jean-François Charles and Jan Bucquoy
 Best foreign artist: Joost Swarte
 Best comical artwork: Robin Dubois: Dites-le avec des gags! by Turk, Le Lombard

1982 
 Grand Prix Saint-Michel: Franz Drappier
 Prix: Jean-Claude Servais
 Best comic: Bob Fish (comic book) by Yves Chaland

1983 
 Best comic: La Belette by Didier Comès, Casterman
 Best comic (joint winner): Thorgal: Au-delà des ombres by Rosinski (artist) and Jean Van Hamme (author), Le Lombard
 Best comical artist: Serge Ernst

1984 
 Grand Prix Saint-Michel: Jeanette Pointu: Le dragon vert by Marc Wasterlain, Dupuis

1986 
 Grand Prix Saint-Michel: Sambre by Yslaire, Glénat

2002 
 Grand Prix Saint-Michel: Hermann 
 Best author (French language): Jacamon
 Best author (Dutch language): Luc Cromheecke
 Best artwork: Jean-François Charles
 Best story: Richelle
 Press prize: Miralles by Jean Dufaux
 Iris award: Le marquis D'Anaon: L'île de Brac by M. Bonhomme and Fabien Vehlmann, Dargaud

2003 
 Grand Prix Saint-Michel: Jacques Martin 
 Best author (French language): Juanjo Guarnido
 Best author (Dutch language): Jan Bosschaert
 Best artwork: Jean-Mouis Mourier
 Best story: André-Paul Duchâteau
 Press prize: Yves Swolfs
 Future: Le voyageur by Etienne Jung
 Youth (French language): Jojo by André Geerts
 Youth (Dutch language): Roboboy by Luc Cromheecke

2004 
 Grand Prix Saint-Michel: Grzegorz Rosiński 
 Best comic (French language): Ou le regard ne porte pas by Olivier Pont and George Abolin
 Best comic (Dutch language): De bewaker van de lans (part 3) by Ersel and Ferry
 Best artwork: Muchacho by Emmanuel Lepage
 Best story: Du plomb dans la tête by Matz
 Best international series: Donjon by Sfar and Trondheim
 Nominated series: Betelgeuse by Léo, Capricorne by Andreas, Le Choucas, Les Coulisses du pouvoir, Le Cri du peuple, Djinn, Fog, Jerôme K. Jerome Bloche by Dodier and Makyo, Ludo, Les Olives Noires, Persepolis by Marjane Satrapi, Sambre by Yslaire, Tramp, Le Tueur, and Bouncer by François Boucq and Alejandro Jodorowsky.
 Press prize: Peyo l'enchanteur by Hugues Dayez
 Future: Dido: Le trophée d'effroi by Fahar
 Public: Armelle et l'oiseau by Antoine Dode
 Illustration: Martine by Marcel Marlier, Casterman

2005 
 Grand Prix Saint-Michel: Jean Graton 
 Prestige: Albert Uderzo
 Best comic (French language): A l'ombre des bougainvillées by Jean-François Charles and Maryse Charles
 Best comic (Dutch language): Bye, bye, Kluit by Vincent
 Best artwork: Terra Incognita by Floc'h
 Best story: Le tour de valse by Lapière
 Press prize: Les éditeurs de Bande Dessinée by Thierry Bellefroid, Niffle
 Future: Fishermen story: En attendant Hemingway by Konior, Caravelle
 Youth: Game Over: Blork raider by Midam and Adam
 Best series: Lincoln by Jouvray

2006 
 Grand Prix Saint-Michel: Lambil 
 - Jean Van Hamme
 - François Walthéry
 - Jacques Tardi
 - André Juillard
 Best comic (French language): Shandy 2: Le dragon d'Austerlitz, Bertail and Matz, Delcourt
 - Seuls 1: Disparition, Bruno Gazzotti and Fabien Vehlmann, Dupuis
 - Vengeance du comte Skarbek 2: Un coeur de bronze, Grzegorz Rosiński and Yves Sente, Dargaud
 - Alim le tanneur 2: Le vent de l'exil, Virginie Augustin and Wilfrid Lupano, Delcourt
 - Combat ordinaire 3: Ce qui est précieux, Emmanuel Larcenet, Dargaud
 - Sur les traces de Dracula 1: Vlad l'empaleur, Hermann and Yves H., Casterman
 - Lune d'argent sur providence 1: L'enfants de l'abime, Éric Hérenguel, Glénat
 Best comic (Dutch language): Het belang van Ernst, Tom Bouden
 - Vlad 7: 15 novembre, Griffo and Yves Swolfs, Le Lombard
 - XIII 17: L'or de Maximilien, William Vance and Jean Van Hamme, Dargaud
 - Suske en Wiske, Willy Vandersteen, Standaard Uitgeverij
 Best artwork: Révélations 2, Ramos and Jenkins, Soleil
 - Shandy 2: Le dragon d'Austerlitz, Bertail and Matz, Delcourt
 - Murena 5: La déesse noire, Philippe Delaby and Jean Dufaux, Dargaud
 - Le ciel au-dessus de Bruxelles 1: Avant, Yslaire, Futuropolis
 - Messire Guillaume 1: Contrées lointaines, Bonhomme and Bonneval, Dupuis
 - Shelena 1, René Follet and Jéromine Pasteur, Casterman
 Best story: Le ciel au-dessus de Bruxelles 1: Avant, Yslaire, Futuropolis
 - Protecto 1: La fabrique des mères éplorées, Matteo and Zidrou, Dupuis
 - Quintett 3: Histoire d'Elias Cohen, Cuzor and Giroud, Dupuis
 - Lune d'argent sur providence 1: L'enfants de l'abime, Éric Hérenguel, Glénat
 - Combat ordinaire 3: Ce qui est précieux, Emmanuel Larcenet, Dargaud
 - Mr. Mardi Gras descendres 4: Le vaccin de la resurrection, Eric Libergé, Dupuis
 - Les petits ruisseaux 1, Pascal Rabaté, Futuropolis
 Press prize: Morris, Franquin, Peyo et le dessin animé, Philippe Capart and Dejasse, L'an 2
 - Dino Attanasio, 60 ans de BD, Dino Attanasio, Coulon and De Kuyssche, Dargaud
 - Sir Arthur Benton, Wannsee 1942, Perger and Tarek, Proust
 - René Goscinny, première vue d'un scénariste de génie, Chatenet and Marmonnier, De La Martinie
 - Periode glacière, Nicolas de Crécy, Futuropolis
 - Jack Palmer, l'affaire du voile, René Pétillon, Albin Michel
 Future: Alim le tanneur 2: Le vent de l'exil, Virginie Augustin and Wilfrid Lupano, Delcourt
 - Sir Arthur Benton, Wannsee 1942, Perger and Tarek, Proust
 - Achtung Zelig 1, Krzysztof Gawronkiewicz and Rosenberg, Casterman
 - Codex angélique 1: Izael, Mikaël Bourguion and Thierry Gloris, Delcourt
 - Cross fire 2: Au service secret de sa sainteté, Pierre-Mony Chan and Sala, Soleil
 Youth: Blagues de Toto 4: Tueur à gags, Thierry Coppée, Delcourt
 - Kid Paddle 10: Dark j'adore, Midam, Dupuis
 - Démons d'Alexia 3: Yorthopia, Ers and Dugomier, Dupuis
 - Spirou et Fantasio 48: L'homme qui ne voulait pas mourir, José-Luis Munuera and Jean-David Morvan, Dupuis
 - Voyage d'Esteban 1: Baleinier, Bonhomme, Milan
 - Ratafia 2: Un zèle imbecile, Frédéric Salsédo and Nicolas Pothier, Treize étrange

2007 
 Grand Prix Saint-Michel: Marcel Gotlieb 
 - André Juillard
 - Régis Loisel
 - Jacques Tardi
 - Jean Van Hamme
 Prestige: Willy Vandersteen
 Best comic (French language): Les Cinq conteurs de Bagdad, Frantz Duchazeau and Fabien Velhmann, Dargaud
 - La Guerre des Sambre 1: Hugo & Iris, Jean Bastide and Vincent Mezil, Glénat – Futuropolis
 - Le Sang des Porphyre 1: Soizik, Joël Parnotte and Balac, Dargaud
 - Magasin général 2: Serge, Régis Loisel and Jean-Louis Tripp, Casterman
 - Miss pas touche 2: Du sang sur les mains, Kerascoët and Hubert, Dargaud
 - Muchacho 2, Emmanuel Lepage, Dupuis
 Best comic (Dutch language): De Maagd en de Neger, papa en Sofie, Judith Vanistendael, De Harmonie - Oog & Blik
 - Suske en Wiske 292: De Nachtwachtbrigade, Luc Morjeau and Peter Van Gucht, Standaard Uitgeverij
 - De Rode Ridder 214: De regensteen, Claus Scholtz and Martin Lodewijk, Standaard Uitgeverij
 - Kaamelott 1: De heerscharen van de dood, Steven Dupré and Alexander Astier, Casterman
 - De bewaker van de lans 5: De erfgenamen, Ersel and Ferry, Glénat
 Best artwork: Sur les traces de Dracula 3: Transylvania, Dany, Casterman
 - Le ciel au-dessus de Bruxelles 2: Après, Yslaire, Futuropolis
 - Le vent dans les sables 2: étranges étrangers, Michel Plessix, Delcourt
 - Magasin général 2: Serge, Régis Loisel and Jean-Louis Tripp, Casterman
 - Muchacho 2, Emmanuel Lepage, Dupuis
 - Murena 6: Le sang des bêtes, Philippe Delaby, Dargaud
 Best story: Sir Arthur Benton 3: l'Assaut final, Tarek, Emmanuel Proust
 - Largo Winch 15: Les yeux des gardiens du tao, Jean Van Hamme, Dupuis
 - Le complexe du chimpanze 1: Paradoxe, Richard Marazano, Dargaud
 - Le janitor 1: l'Ange de Malte, Yves Sente, Dargaud
 - Quintett 4: Histoiure de Nafsika Vasli, Frank Giroud, Dupuis
 - RG 1: Riyad-sur-Seine, Pierre Dragon, Gallimard
 Press prize: Arnest Ringard et Augraphie, Frédéric Jannin and Yvan Delporte, Marsu Productions
 - Bruxelles métropole 1: Ville haute, Pablo Santander and Jean-François Di Giorgio, Glénat
 - Gotlib 1: Ma vie en vrac, Gotlib, Flammarion
 - Le Bouddha d'azur 2, Cosey, Dupuis
 - Le retour à la terre 4: Le déluge, Manu Larcenet and Jean-Yves Ferri, Dargaud
 - Les noëls de Franquin, André Franquin and Yvan Delporte, Marsu Productions
 Future: La Guerre des Sambre 1: Hugo & Iris, Jean Bastide and Vincent Mezil, Glénat - Futuropolis
 - La licorne 1: Le dernier temple d'Asclepios, Anthony Jean and Mathieu Gabella, Delcourt
 - Le grand siècle 1: Alphonse, Andriveau Simon, Delcourt
 - Le monde selon François 1: Le secret des écrivains, Renaud Collin and Vincent Zabus, Dupuis
 - Le trone d'argile 2: Le pont de Montereau, Theo Caneschi and Nicolas Jarry, Delcourt
 - Orbital 2: Ruptures, Serge Pelle and Sylvain Runberg, Dupuis
 Youth: Nävis: Latitzoury, José-Luis Munuera and Jean-David Morvan, Delcourt
 - Basil et Victoria 5: Ravenstein, Edith and Yann, Les Humanoïdes Associés
 - Jojo 16: Jojo vétérinaire, André Geerts, Dupuis
 - Le monde selon François 1: Le secret des écrivains, Renaud Collin and Vincent Zabus, Dupuis
 - Le voyage d'Esteban 2: Traqués, Mathieu Bonhomme, Milan
 - Ma maman ... 1: Est en Amérique et elle a rencontrée Buffalo Bill, Emile Bravo and Jean Regnaud, Gallimard

2008 
 Grand Prix Saint-Michel: Raoul Cauvin
 - Christophe Arleston
 - Moebius
 - Jean Van Hamme
 - François Walthéry
 Best comic (French language): Spirou hors série 4: Journal d'un ingénu, Emile Bravo, Dupuis
 - Bois des vierges 1, Béatrice Tillier and Jean Dufaux, Robert Laffont
 - De Gaule a la page, Jean-Yves Ferri, Dargaud
 - Les aigles de Rome 1, Enrico Marini, Dargaud
 - Miss Endicott 1 and 2, Xavier Fourquemin and Jean-Christophe Derrien, Lombard
 - Sang des porphyre 2: Konan, Joel Parnotte and Balac, Dargaud
 Best comic (Dutch language): 'Jump 1-3, Charel Cambré, Standaard Uitgeverij
 - De eenzame snelweg: In het spoor van..., Raoul Deleo and Auke Hulst, Meulenhoff
 - De Furox 1: Diaspora, Simon Spruyt, Bries
 - Havank 1: Hoofden op hol, Daan Jippes and HF Van Der Kallen, Luitingh-Sijthoff
 - Het jaar van de olifant 3-6, Willy Linthout, Bries
 - Meccano 10: De ruwe gids, Hanco Kolk, De Harmonie
 Best artwork: La Quête de l'oiseau du temps 2: Le grimoire des dieux, Mohamed Aouamri, Dargaud
 - Bois des vierges 1, Béatrice Tillier, Robert Laffont
 - Bouncer 8: La veuve noire, François Boucq, Humano
 - La femme accident 1, Olivier Grenson, Dupuis
 - Les aigles de Rome 1, Enrico Marini, Dargaud
 - Pêches mignons 2: Chasse à l'homme, Arthur De Pins, Fluide Glacial
 - Sang des porphyre 2: Konan, Joel Parnotte, Dargaud
 - Spirou hors série 3: Tombeau des Champignac, Fabrice Tarrin, Dupuis
 Best story: Il était une fois en France 1: L'empire de monsieur Joseph, Glénat
 - Coeur des batailles 1 and 2, Jean-David Morvan, Delcourt
 - Pascal brutal 2: Male dominant, Riad Sattouf, Fluide
 - RG 2: Bangkok-Belleville, Pierre Dragon, Gallimard
 - Sept missionaires 4, Alain Ayroles, Delcourt
 - Spirou hors série 4: Journal d'un ingénu, Emile Bravo, Dupuis
 - Tanatos 1: L'année sanglante, Didier Convard, Glénat
 - Tiffany 2: Célestine T 1867, Yann, Delcourt
 Press prize: J'étais Tintin au cinéma, Hergé and Jean-Pierre Talbot, Jourdan
 - De Gaule a la page, Jean-Yves Ferri, Dargaud
 - Franquin: Chronolgie d'un oeuvre, André Franquin, Bocquet and Verhoest, Marsu Productions
 - RG 2: Bangkok-Belleville, Frederik Peeters and Pierre Dragon, Gallimard
 - La véritable histoire de Futuropolis 1: 1972 - 1994, Florence Cestac, Dargaud
 - Voyaguer de Troy: Entretien avec Arleston, Christophe Arleston and Thierry Bellefroid, Soleil
 Future: Lawrence d'Arabie 1: La revolte arabe, Alexis Horellou and Tarek, Emmanuel Proust
 - Le monde selon François 2: Les amants éternels, Renaud Collin and Vincent Zabus, Dupuis
 - Pêches mignons 2: Chasse à l'homme, Arthur De Pins, Fluide Glacial
 - Taiga rouge 1, Vincent Perriot and Arnaud Malherbe, Dupuis
 - La ligne de fuite, Benjamin Flao and Christophe Dabitch, Futuropolis
 Youth: Démons d'Alexia 4: Le syndrôme de Salem, Benoît Ers and Dugomier, Dupuis
 - Jacques le petit lézard géant 1, Libon, Dupuis
 - Jojo 17: Confisqué, André Geerts, Dupuis
 - Le monde selon François 2: Les amants éternels, Renaud Collin and Vincent Zabus, Dupuis
 - Seuls 3: Le clan du requin, Bruno Gazzotti and Fabien Vehlmann, Dupuis
 - Spirou hors série 3: Tombeau des Champignac, Fabrice Tarrin, Dupuis

 2009 
 Grand Prix Saint-Michel: Jean Van Hamme Best comic (French language): Il était une fois en France,  and Sylvain Vallée, Glénat
 Best comic (Dutch language): Kaamelott, Steven Dupré, Casterman
 Best artwork: Long John Silver 2: Neptune, Mathieu Lauffray, Dargaud
 Best artwork (joint winner): XIII Mystery 1: La mangouste, Ralph Meyer, Dargaud
 Best story: Lulu femme nue, Etienne Davodeau, Futuropolis
 Press prize: Marzi: La bruit des vi!lles, Sylvain Savoia, Dupuis
 Future: Pico Bogue: Situations critiques, Dominique Roques and Alexis Dormal, Dargaud
 Youth: Légende de Changeling: Le croque-mitaine, Xavier Fourquemin and Pierre Dubois, Le Lombard

 2010 
 Grand Prix Saint-Michel: André-Paul Duchâteau Best comic (French language): Quai d'Orsay 1, Christophe Blain and Abel Lanzac, Dargaud
 - Bouncer 7, François Boucq and Alejandro Jodorowsky, Humanoïdes
 - Long John Silver 3, Matthieu Lauffray and Xavier Dorison, Dargaud
 - Rebetiko 1, David Prudhomme, Futuropolis
 Best comic (Dutch language): Boerke 6, Pieter de Poortere, Oog en Blik
 - Apostata 2, Ken Broeders, Standaard Uitgeverij
 - De telescoop, Paul Teng and Jean Van Hamme, Casterman
 - Het jaar van de olifant 2, Willy Linthout, Catullus
 - Playin' Smilin' Fightin' Cookin' , Philippe Paquet and different writers, Bries
 Best artwork: Le dernier des Mohicains, Cromwell, Soleil
 - Bois Maury 14, Hermann, Glénat
 - Murena 7, Philippe Delaby, Dargaud
 - Siegfried 2, Alex Alice, Dargaud
 - Chat qui courait sur les toits, René Hausman, Lombard
 Best story: Lefranc 28, Michel Jacquemart, Casterman
 - Ethan Ringler 5, Denis-Pierre Filippi, Dupuis
 - Il était une fois en France 3, Glénat
 - Long John Silver 3, Xavier Dorison, Dargaud
 - Signe de la lune, Enrique Bonet, Dargaud
 Press prize: Pour l'Empire 1, Merwan and Bastien Vives, Dargaud - Encyclopédie de la féerie 1, Mohamed Aouamri and Pierre Dubois, Dargaud
 - Putain de guerre intégrale 2, Jacques Tardi and Jean-Pierre Verney, Casterman
 - Ben Laden Dévoilé, Philippe Bercovici and Mohamed Sifaoui, 12 Bis
 - Yvan Delporte: rédacteur en chef, Christelle and Bertrand Pissavy-Yvernault, Dupuis
 Future: Magus 2, Annabel, Glénat - Missi Dominici 1, Benoit Dellac and Thierry Gloris, Vents d'Ouest
 - Talisman 2, Montse Martin and François Debois, Glénat
 - Koryu d'Edo, Dimitri Piot, Glénat
 Youth: Quatre de Bakerstreet 2, David Etien, Djian and Legrand, Vents d'Ouest - Jerome K. Jerome Blôche 21, Alain Dodier, Dupuis
 - Pico Bogue 3, Alexis Dormal and Dominiques Roques, Dargaud
 - Une aventure de ... Spirou 6, Fabrice Parme and Lewis Trondheim, Dupuis
 - Tamara 8, Christian Darasse and Zidrou, Dupuis

 2011 
 Grand Prix Saint-Michel: Philippe Delaby Best comic (French language):Sambre 6, Yslaire, Glénat
 - Blacksad 4, Juanjo Guarnido and Juan Diaz Canales, Dargaud
 - Matteo 2, Jean-Pierre Gibrat, Futuropolis
 - Page Noire, Ralph Meyer, Frank Giroud and Denis Lapière, Futuropolis
 - Zombillenium 1, Arthur de Pins, Dupuis
 Best comic (Dutch language): Ondergronds, Wauter Mannaert and Pierre De Jaeger, Oog & Blik
 - Apache Junction 1, Peter Nuyten, Silvester
 - Dickie 4, Pieter De Poortere, Glénat
 - Grand Prix 2, Marvano, Dargaud
 - Vincent van Gogh, Marc Verhaeghen and Jan Kragt, Eureducation
 Best artwork: Sept Cavaliers 3, Jacques Terpant, Delcourt
 - Bois des Vierges 2, Beatrice Tillier, Delcourt
 - Polina, Bastien Vives, Casterman
 - XIII Mystery 3, Eric Henninot, Dargaud
 - Yaxin 1, Man Arenas, Soleil
 Best story: Alter Ego, Pierre-Paul Renders and Denis Lapière, Dupuis
 - Il était une fois en France 4, Glénat
 - Mezek, Yann, Lombard
 - Les mondes de Thorgal: Kriss de Valnor 1, Yves Sente, Lombard
 - La Mort de Staline: Une histoire vraie 1, Dargaud
 Press prize:Maurice Tillieux, Maurice Tillieux and Vincent Odin, Daniel Maghen
 - Spirou Dream Team, Simon Leturgie and Yann, Dupuis
 - Venus Noire, Renaud Pennelle and Abdellatif Kechiche, Proust
 Future:Khaal, Valentin Secher and Stephane Louis, Soleil
 - Barracuda 1, Jeremy Petiqueux and Jean Dufaux, Dargaud
 - Ondergronds, Wauter Mannaert and Pierre de Jaeger, Oog & Blik
 - Les voyages de Lefranc, Olivier Weinberg, Jacques Martin e.a., Casterman
 Youth:Le royaume 3, Benoît Feroumont, Dupuis
 - La légende du changeling 4, Xavier Fourquemin and Pierre Dubois, Lombard
 - Maki 2, Fabrice Tarrin, Dupuis
 - Mon pépé est un fantôme 4, Taduc and Nicolas Barral, Dupuis

 2012 
 Grand Prix Saint-Michel: Jean-François Charles Best comic (French language):Le Mort de Staline,  and  Best comic (Dutch language): Afspraak in Nieuwpoort, Ivan Adriaenssens Best artwork: XIII Mystery: Colonel Amos, François Boucq Best story: Olympe de Gouges, José-Louis Bocquet  Press prize:Svoboda 2, Jean-Denis Pendanx and Kris Future:Du vent sous les pieds emporte mes pas, Gaëtan Brynaert Youth:Les Légendaires origines, Nadou Prestige: Stelo Fenzo 2013 
 Grand Prix Saint-Michel: Philippe Geluck Best comic (French language):Il était une fois en France 6,  and Sylvain Vallée Best comic (Dutch language): Amoras 1, Charel Cambré and Marc Legendre Best artwork: Le Loup des Mers, Riff Reb's Best story: Dent d'Ours 1, Yann Press prize:Marcinelle 1956 , Sergio Salma Future:La Peau de l'Ours, Oriol Youth:Lou 6, Julien Neel 2015 
 Grand Prix Saint-Michel: François Walthéry Best comic (French language): Amère Russie 2 by Anlor and Aurélien Ducoudray 
 Best comic (Dutch language): De terugkeer van de wespendief by Aimée de Jongh
 Best artwork: Ralph Meyer for Undertaker 1
 Best story: Pat Perna for Kersten, médecin d'Himmler 1
 Press prize: Mobutu dans l'espace by Eddy Vaccaro and Aurélien Ducoudray
 Future: Roi ours by Mobidic
 Youth: Les carnets de Cérise 3 by Aurélie Neyret and Joris Chamblain

 2016 
 Grand Prix Saint-Michel: Milo Manara Best comic (French language): L'homme qui tua Lucky Luke by Matthieu Bonhomme
 Best comic (Dutch language): Jhen 15 by Paul Teng
 Best artwork: Frederik Peeters for L’odeur des garçons affamés
 Best story: Xavier Dorison and Fabien Nury for Comment faire fortune en juin 40
 Press prize: Christophe Simon for Corentin 8
 Future: Communardes 2 by Lucy Mazel
 Youth: Les enfants de la résistance 2 by Benoît Ers and Vincent Dugomier

 2017 
 Grand Prix Saint-Michel: Philippe Berthet Best comic (French language): L'adoption 2 by Arno Monin and Zidrou
 Best comic (Dutch language): Het wijfje by Nele Sys
 Best artwork: José Homs for Shi 1
 Best story: Nathalie Sergeef for Hyver 1709 2
 Press prize: Mickey Mouse, café Zombo by Régis Loisel
 Future: Reporter n° 1 Bloody Sunday by Gontran Toussaint
 Youth: Dad 3 by Nob

 2018 
 Grand Prix Saint-Michel: Jean-Claude Mézières'''
 Best comic (French language): Il s'appelait Ptirou by Yves Sente and Laurent Verron
 Best artwork: David Sala for Le joueur d'échecs Best story: Lewis Trondheim for Je vais rester Future: Churchill et moi by Andrea Cucchi
 Youth: Frnck 3 by Brice Cossu and Olivier Bocquet
 Humour: '' 4 by Paul Cauuet and Wilfrid Lupano

References 

History of the Prix, with a list of all winners

External links
Official site

Comics awards
Belgian literary awards
Bandes dessinées
Culture in Brussels
Awards established in 1971
Municipal awards
1971 establishments in Belgium
Brussels-related lists